The Enemies of Energy a 2000 jazz album release by Kurt Rosenwinkel. Its release marked Rosenwinkel's third album as a band leader.

Track listing

Personnel
 Kurt Rosenwinkel – guitar
 Mark Turner – tenor saxophone
 Scott Kinsey – piano, keyboards
 Ben Street – double bass
 Jeff Ballard – drums

References

2000 albums
Verve Records albums
Kurt Rosenwinkel albums